Charalampos "Haris" Stamboulidis (born 22 June 1996) is a professional footballer who plays as a midfielder or defender for Greek club Veria. A versatile player, he plays as either a central defender, a full back on either side or a defensive midfielder.

Born in Australia, Stamboulidis represented Greece internationally at under-19 level.

Early life 
Born in Melbourne, Victoria, Stamboulidis lived for an extended period in Uruguay in 2005/2006 between the age of 9 to 10, where he trained at Diego Forlán's football academy in Montevideo. Upon returning to Australia, he progressed through the youth systems of Heidelberg United, Essendon Royals, Northcote City, before returning to Heidelberg.

Club career

Early career
Stamboulidis captained the U13 and U14 Victorian State teams and earned a spot in the U13 Qantas Socceroos 30-man squad. In 2007, he won the Victorian State School Championship amongst a participation of 1,600 schools with Ivanhoe East Primary School.

In 2013, aged 16, Stamboulidis was part of the senior squad at Heidelberg United FC which won the year's Victorian State League 1. In 2014, he joined A-League side Melbourne City FC, and was a part of both their National Youth League Premiership team (NYL) and their senior National Premier Leagues Victoria 2 team (NPL).

College career
In 2015, after graduating high school, Stamboulidis enrolled at Columbia University, and played three seasons with Columbia Lions men's soccer team. In 2016, he helped Columbia win their first Ivy League title since 1993. He also trained with New York Red Bulls' under-23 team for a brief period in 2015.

Stamboulidis spent three-and-a-half-years at Columbia University, graduating from the prestigious Ivy League University with a degree in Economics and playing 40 matches for the Lions.

Colorado Rapids
In 2017, Stamboulidis joined Colorado Rapids U-23 in the Premier Development League, playing ten matches in 2017 and another four matches in the 2018 season.

Aris
On 25 July 2018, Super League Greece side Aris Thessaloniki announced the signing of Stamboulidis on a one-year contract, after Paco Herrera trialled Stamboulidis during preseason in Greece and the club’s preseason tour in the Netherlands. Despite featuring for the Greek giants in preseason friendlies in the Netherlands against Den Haag and Willem II, Stamboulidis only featured twice as an unused substitute in January 2019.

Extremadura 
On 8 August 2019, Stamboulidis signed a one-year deal with Spanish Segunda División side Extremadura UD, being the first Australian player of the club's history. However, he spent the campaign unregistered, being unable to feature for the first team or the reserve team.

Langreo 
On 8 October 2020, after a successful trial at Cultural Leonesa, terms could not be agreed upon and Stamboulidis signed for Segunda División B side UP Langreo. He featured in a total of six matches for the side before departing.

Almopos Aridea 
On 26 August 2021, Almopos Aridea announced the signing of Stamboulidis. He made his debut with the newly promoted team on 28 November, replacing Dimitris Aslabaloglou in a 2–0 away loss against Xanthi for the Super League Greece 2 championship.

Irodotos 
On 21 January 2022, Stamboulidis moved to fellow-second division side Irodotos.

International career
Born in Australia, Stamboulidis is of Greek descent; he is eligible to play for both Australia and Greece.

Australia 
Subsequent to a successful national championship with the Victorian State Team in 2009, Stamboulidis was selected to form the 30 man squad for the U13 Qantas Socceroos.

In 2015, Stamboulidis played for the Australia U19 Schoolboys.

During a youth game between Melbourne City FC and Melbourne Victory FC, Stamboulidis was identified by Paul Okon, the Australia U20 coach, during his scouting visit to the Melbourne Derby. Josep Gombau in his role as Australia U23 coach, also had discussions with Stamboulidis regarding him joining the Olyroos.

Greece 
In March 2015, Stamboulidis was invited to take part in the Greece national under-19 team national team, following his tour with the Australia U19 Schoolboys tour in the United Kingdom in January. Late in the month, he featured in two friendlies against Ukraine U19 in Tripoli, Greece.

While preparing for the Greece national U19 team friendlies against Ukraine, Stamboulidis trained with U20 AEK and was asked to join them by Stelios Manolas. Stamboulidis however decided to accept a scholarship offered to him by Columbia University in New York City.

In June 2015, Stamboulidis noted he wanted to play for Australia.

Personal life 
Stamboulidis' younger brother George is also a footballer and student-athlete at Yale University.

References

External links
 
 

1996 births
Living people
Soccer players from Melbourne
Australian people of Greek descent
Association football midfielders
Association football defenders
Australian soccer players
Greek footballers
Heidelberg United FC players
Melbourne City FC players
Columbia Lions men's soccer players
New York Red Bulls players
Colorado Rapids U-23 players
Aris Thessaloniki F.C. players
Extremadura UD footballers
UP Langreo footballers
Almopos Aridea F.C. players
Irodotos FC players
Segunda División B players
Super League Greece 2 players
Australian expatriate soccer players
Australian expatriate sportspeople in the United States
Australian expatriate sportspeople in Spain
Greek expatriate footballers
Greek expatriate sportspeople in the United States
Greek expatriate sportspeople in Spain
Greece youth international footballers
Expatriate soccer players in the United States
Expatriate footballers in Spain